Scott Sims may refer to:

Scott Sims (basketball) (born 1955), American professional basketball player
Scott Sims (veterinarian) (1955–2015), American veterinarian and television personality

See also
Scott Simms (born 1969), Canadian politician